This is a list of video games for the Nintendo Switch video game console that have sold or shipped at least one million copies. As Nintendo shares the sales of their video games every quarter while most other publishers do not share sales figures per console, this list consists mostly of Nintendo-published titles.

Nintendo Switch, a hybrid home console and handheld device, launched worldwide on March 3, 2017. By the end of 2017, it had outsold the lifetime sales of Wii U, its home console predecessor. In September 2019, Nintendo launched the Nintendo Switch Lite, a handheld-only version of the system. By the end of 2020, total Nintendo Switch family units had outsold the lifetime sales of the Nintendo 3DS, its handheld console predecessor, by selling nearly 80 million units. By December 2022, over 122 million Switches with 994 million copies of games had been sold for the platform. Mario Kart 8 Deluxe is the best-selling game on the platform at over 52 million copies sold. The Mario franchise alone has sold 182.69 million copies on the Nintendo Switch. The Legend of Zelda franchise has sold 42.99 million copies and the Pokémon franchise has sold over 97.08 million copies on the Nintendo Switch. Splatoon was also a massive selling franchise on the Nintendo Switch, selling 23.43 million copies.

List

Notes

References

 
Nintendo Switch
Best-selling Nintendo Switch video games